Praslin is the second largest island (38.5 km2) of the Inner Seychelles, lying  northeast of Mahé. Praslin has a population of around 7,533 people and comprises two administrative districts: Baie Sainte Anne and Grand' Anse. The main settlements are the Baie Ste Anne, Anse Volbert and Grand' Anse.

It was named Isle de Palmes by explorer Lazare Picault in 1744. During that time it was used as a hideaway by pirates and Arab merchants. In 1768 it was renamed Praslin in honor of French diplomat César Gabriel de Choiseul, duc de Praslin.

Praslin is known as a tourist destination with several hotels and resorts, as well as a number of beaches such as Anse Lazio and Anse Georgette.

It has substantial tracts of tropical forests with birds such as the endemic Seychelles bulbul and the Seychelles black parrot. The Vallée de Mai Nature Preserve, established in 1979, is known for the unique coco de mer and vanilla orchids. It has been reported that General Charles George Gordon of Khartoum (1833-1885) was convinced that Vallée de Mai was the Biblical "Garden of Eden".

Praslin is home to Praslin Island Airport, while surrounding islands include Curieuse Island, La Digue, Cousin Island, Cousine Island and Aride Island. There are a few near offshore islets including Round Island (0.193 km2) and Chauve Souris (0.007 km2), both of which have hotel accommodations.

A large area in the south of the island has been designated as Praslin National Park and surrounding areas Important Bird Area.

Gallery

See also

References

External links 
 
 
 Maps of Praslin
 Gallery of Praslin
 Praslin Reptiles List
 Praslin Fish List

 
Islands of Praslin Islands
Somali Sea